Saturday Night Review (also seen as Saturday Night Revue) is a live American variety television series that was broadcast on NBC in 1953 and 1954 as a summer replacement for Your Show of Shows.

1953 version 
Hoagy Carmichael was the host of Saturday Night Review, the main premise of which was the introduction of new entertainers. NBC executives viewed the program as a vehicle for testing those performers in hopes of developing new programs that would feature some of them. Those who appeared on it included Eddy Arnold, Dick Wesson, Cass Daley,   Sunny Gale, Jackie Kannon and George Gobel. The show featured sets representing Carmichael's penthouse apartment and a nightclub. Episodes opened with him entertaining friends in the apartment, after which they moved to the nightclub to watch performers. Gordon Jenkins led the program's orchestra. The show was broadcast from 9 to 10:30 p.m. on Saturdays, beginning on June 6, 1953, and ending on September 5, 1953.

Critical reception
Critic Jack Gould found little to like about the program in his review in The New York Times, describing the show as "an uninspired ninety minutes that was hard to distinguish from an audition." He wrote that the program "needs to be taken in hand vigorously, given a point of view routined with some imagination and revamped to capitalize on Mr. Carmichael's talents".

1954 version 
Eddie Albert was the master of ceremonies when Saturday Night Review again replaced Your Show of Shows in the summer of 1954, and the format was "more of a straight revue". Pat Carroll was a regular. Ben Blue and Alan Young alternated weeks as the show's comedians, and the Sauter-Finegan Orchestra provided music. The program again focused on presenting new performers.

Saturday Night Review originated in Hollywood with Ernie Glucksman as producer and Jim Jordan as director. The writers were Jack Ellinson, Milton Geiger, Jerry Seelin, Phil Shukin, and Snag Werris. It began on June 12, 1954, and ended on September 18, 1954.

Critical reception
A review in the trade publication Billboard summed up the show as "better than most" summer programs. Albert and Blue were commended for maintaining a "free and easy atmosphere" over the 90-minutes length, regardless of the quality of the material. Reviewer June Bundy wrote, "the over-all effect was one of beguiling nonchalance".

Earlier use of title
Saturday Night Review was used in 1950 as an umbrella title for two programs, The Jack Carter Show (8-9 p.m. ET) and Your Show of Shows (9-10:30 p.m. E.T.).

References 

1953 American television series debuts
1954 American television series endings
1950s American television series
NBC original programming